The 2010–11 French Guiana Division d'Honneur was the 38th season of the top tier of football in Guyana. The champions were US Matoury who won their third league title, and their first since 2005–06.

Changes from 2009–10
 Cosma Foot and Olympique Cayenne were relegated to the French Guiana Promotion d'Honneur.
 EF Iracoubo and ASC Black Stars were promoted to the Championnat National

Table

Related competitions

Coupe de France 

As winners of the 2009–10 French Guiana Championnat National, ASC Le Geldar earned a berth in the overseas bracket in the seventh round proper of the Coupe de France. Le Geldar played amateur French side, FC Martigues and lost 2–0.

CFU Club Championship 

For the 2011 edition of the CFU Club Championship, French Guiana was allowed to send two representatives to the tournament, but declined to participate.

CONCACAF Champions League 

As no French Guiana clubs entered in the 2010 CFU Club Championship, no teams  from the Championnat National played in the Champions League.

References

French Guiana Régional 1 seasons
French
1